The 2015 Southeast Asian Games, officially known as the 28th Southeast Asian Games, or the 28th SEA Games, and commonly known as Singapore 2015, was a Southeast Asian multi-sport event held by the city-state of Singapore from 5 to 16 June 2015, It was the fourth time the country hosted the games. Singapore previously also hosted the games in 1973, 1983 and 1993 edition.

Singapore was awarded rights to host the Southeast Asian Games in 2011. The games were held from 5 to 16 June 2015, although several events had commenced from 29 May 2015. Around 4370 athletes participated at the event, which featured 402 events in 36 sports. It was opened by Tony Tan Keng Yam, the President of Singapore at the aforementioned stadium.

The final medal tally was led by Thailand, which won the most gold medals, followed by host Singapore which won the most medals overall. Several Games and national records were broken during the games. The games were deemed as one of the most successful Southeast Asian games ever hosted with its effective management of cost spent to host the games and well-organised arrangement of public transport by Singapore, as well as the huge effort to promote the games which helped raise the standards of competition amongst the Southeast Asian nations.

Host city

Singapore's selection as the host of the 28th Southeast Asian Games of 2015 was announced in 2011 during the 26th Southeast Asian Games, held in Indonesian cities Palembang and Jakarta. Singapore had previously been nominated to host the event in 2007 and 2013, but turned down both opportunities citing costs associated with the construction of the new Singapore Sports Hub that was exacerbated by the financial crisis of 2007–2008.

Development and preparation
The Singapore SEA Games Organising Committee (SINGSOC) was formed on 28 June 2012 to oversee the staging of the event.

Venues

The 2015 Southeast Asian Games used a mix of new, existing and temporary venues. Given the city-state's compact size, most venues were pre-existing public-sporting facilities located in the suburban heartlands which were reverted to public use after the games. No major retrofitting work were done in most venues as most had been used to host major multi-disciplinary events such as the 2010 Youth Olympic Games.

At the centrepiece of the activities was the Singapore Sports Hub which was completed in mid-2014. Incorporating the new 55,000-seat national stadium, it hosted most of the events.

A games village was not built. Instead, a "village in the city" concept saw athletes and officials housed in 20 hotels in downtown Singapore. Besides being physically near to the Singapore Sports Hub, it was hoped that it will add vibe to the city and reduce post-games costs in converting a dedicated games village to other uses.

The 28th Southeast Asian Games had 30 venues for the games.

Public transport
Given the existing extensive public transport network already in place, there is no games-specific major infrastructural development to support it. The clustering of venues is aimed at easing the traffic flow, bus and Mass Rail Transit service for games athletes and officials were provided.

Volunteers
The organisers estimated that about 15,000 volunteers are needed to successfully host the games. Volunteer recruitment began in late 2013, and by February 2014, about 5,000 volunteers have already signed up. This number swelled to over 17,000 by February 2015, and a volunteers night event was held at Universal Studios Singapore to launch the sports volunteers brand name as "Team Nila" and to thank the volunteers who have signed up with free shows at the venue. Amongst the pool of 17,000 volunteers, 35% came from the community, while 65% were from corporations in support of the games.

Ticketing
A total of about 790,000 tickets were put on online sale from February 2015, at the Singapore Indoor Stadium and at SingPost outlets. To encourage public participation in the games, it was announced on 28 January 2015 that 18 of the sports will be free for spectators, while the other 18 are kept at relatively affordable levels of between S$5 to S$20. By 15 April 2015 some sports such as swimming and fencing were selling fast, while silat and sepak takraw were much less popular. Organisers reported that ticket sales were pass 70% for most sports by 27 April, with fencing and swimming being the most popular at 85 and 70% tickets sold respectively, while rhythmic gymnastics, silat and wushu have also sold over 70%. Billiards and snooker, equestrian, sepak takraw, taekwondo, and artistic gymnastics have sold about half their tickets. Rugby and judo have sold 30%, while table tennis has sold only 20%.

Priced between S$5 to S$20, priority sales for the opening and closing ceremonies tickets for those who registered theirs interests in 2014 began on 15 January 2015, while sales for the general public began on 22 January 2015. In February 2015, tickets to the opening ceremony were going at over seven times their original value on unauthorised websites, despite 40% of the tickets still available at that time. By March 2015, tickets to the opening ceremony were sold out.

Countdown
During the closing ceremony of the 2013 Southeast Asian Games, the SEAG Flag was formally handed over from Myanmar to Singapore. This was followed by a song and dance section highlighting Singapore as the next venue.

On 27 June 2014, a series of festivities were held at the Singapore Sports Hub, including a fireworks display, to mark the one year countdown to the games. The Sports Hub Community Open House was held in conjunction with the launch to introduce the new sports facilities to the general public.

The countdown to the games began on 15 February 2014 with a launch party at the Gardens by the Bay, where the logo, theme and mascot were also introduced.

800 Nanyang Polytechnic students organised a major countdown event on 11 April 2015 to mark the final 50 days in a few days, where about 4,000 people turned up to attend a concert and a sports carnival.

On 16 April 2015, the 50-day countdown began with various organisations stacking a number each through a video tribute. This included: Nanyang Polytechnic and Ang Mo Kio residents and Changkat Primary School (50), London School of Business and Finance Singapore (49), Compassvale Primary School (48), Development Bank of Singapore (47), National Kidney Foundation (46), CWT Limited (45), SportCares (44), Park View Primary School (43), Sport Singapore (42) and 41st Battalion Singapore Armoured Regiment (41).

Other organisations were:

 Corporation Primary School (40)
 Wengsworld Jigsaw Puzzles (39)
 Henry Park Primary School (38) 
 Woodlands Ring Primary School (37)
 Yio Chu Kang Community Sports Club (36)
 Temasek Primary School (35)
 East Coast Primary School (34)
 Yayasan Mendaki and Woodlands Secondary School (33)
 Team Singapore (32)
 Fuchun Secondary School (31)
 Jiemin Primary School (30)
 Tampines Primary School (29)
 Punggol Green Primary School (28)
 Northland Primary School (27)
 Telok Kurau Primary School (26)
 Temasek Polytechnic (25)
 AXA Singapore (24)
 Nanyang Polytechnic (23)
 Shelton College International (22)
 Tampines North Primary School (21)
 Ministry of Social and Family (20)
 Dunman Secondary School (19)
 NTUC FairPrice and Seng Kang Primary School (18)
 Canberra Primary School (17)
 Ferrari Owners' Club (16)
 Compassvale Secondary School (15)
 Pasir Ris West (14)
 Republic Polytechnic and Teck Ghee Primary School (13)
 LionsXII (12)
 Deli Hub Catering (11)
 Sembawang Primary School (10)
 Rajah & Tann and St Joseph's Institution Junior (9)
 Qihua Primary School (8)
 Singapore Polytechnic and Fernvale Primary School (7)
 Singtel (6)
 Dazhong Primary School and One KM (5)
 Scuderia FSG (4)
 United Square (3)
 Deloitte (2)
 Montfort Junior School and Team Nila Volunteers (1)

Security

The principal agency to ensure the security of the games is the Singapore Police Force, supplemented by the Auxiliary Police Forces. The organisers singled out security as one of their major concerns ahead of the games, with concerns over unforeseen security breaches which may occur across any of the venues, some of which are easily accessible by the public.

Medals
The design of the medals were unveiled on 27 April 2015. Designed by Joys Tan from Sport Singapore, they feature the Games' logo on one side, and the Singapore Sports Hub on the reverse. Each medal will be 80mm in diameter and will each weigh 183 grams. It was also announced during the media brief, that smaller versions of the medal, in the form of medallions, will be given to all spectators of the closing ceremony.

Costs
The games was budgeted to cost SGD325 million (US$287 million) but eventual cost came to SGD264 million. There were concerns the cost would exceed budget, as had happened when Singapore hosted the Youth Olympics in 2010. In contrast, the cost of organising the 2013 games, which was hosted by Myanmar, was estimated to be SGD400 million.

Torch relay
The torch relay took place on 4 June 2015, the eve of the games' opening ceremony began with the torch lit at the Marina Bay Promontory, and went past Clifford Square, Merlion Park, Esplanade Plaza, the Art Science Museum and end at Marina Bay Sands, where the flame handover ceremony to the Games officials took place.

Marketing

Motto
The motto of the 2015 Southeast Asian Games and ASEAN Para Games is "Celebrate the Extraordinary". It was chosen to represent the connection of individuals, communities and countries to their own dreams beyond competing, winning or overcoming defeat and the inspiration of the soul and spirit inside each people of Southeast Asia.

Logo 
The logo of the 2015 Southeast Asian Games is an image depicts a winning athlete crossing the finishing line with his/her arms raised in victory represents the potential that exists in every participating athletes. The five figure of the sport events competed represents the diversity of sports featured in the Games, the strength and the skills of the athletes. The palette of colours represents the exciting moments of the games and Sport as a tool of uniting people of the region regardless of their language, belief and colours. Overall, it represents the unity of Southeast Asian people in the spirit of the games. The logo also depicts the Southeast Asian Games Federation logo and the word "28th SEA Games". The word "Singapore 2015" on the finishing tape represents Singapore as the host of the 2015 Southeast Asian Games.

Mascot
The mascot of the 2015 Southeast Asian Games and ASEAN Para Games is a lion named Nila. The name comes from Sang Nila Utama, the founder of Singapura. Nila has a red mane and heart-shaped face and is described as courage, passionate and friendly. He wears either his signature tracksuit or blue sporting attire, depending on the occasion.

Songs
A special compilation album titled Songs of the Games was produced by veteran music director Sydney Tan and released on 3 March 2015. It features the three official theme songs: "Unbreakable" written by Amir Masoh and performed by Tabitha Nauser, "Greatest" by Daphne Khoo and "Ordinary" written by Amir Masoh and performed by The Sam Willows. The other songs included: "You're Wonderful" written by Amir Masoh and performed by Tay Kewei, Gayle Nerva and Tabitha Nauser, "Flags Up" written and performed by The Sam Willows, "Champion" written by Charlie Lim and performed by The Sam Willows, "Still" written and performed by Charlie Lim, "A Love Song-Unbreakable" written by Don Richmond and performed by Benjamin Kheng, "Forever" written by Joshua Wan and performed by The Steve McQueens, "You're almost There" written and performed by Joel and co-written by Ruth Ling, "Dancing on the world" written and performed by HubbaBubbas, "Colours" written and performed by Jean Tan and "Reach" written by Dick Lee and performed by the MGS Choir featuring Dick Lee.

Sponsors
A total of 100 sponsors, comprising 4 Main sponsors, 10 Official sponsors, 27 Official partners and 59 Official supporters contributed to the 2015 Southeast Asian Games. The broadcasting rights of the main sponsor MediaCorp is owned by MediaCorp TV.

The Games

Opening ceremony

The opening ceremony was held on Friday, 5 June 2015, beginning at 20:15 SST (UTC+8) at the National Stadium in Singapore, the first major opening ceremony for a sporting event in the new venue. Organised by the Singapore Armed Forces, which has also been responsible for the annual National Day Parade, they were supported by a creative team with Beatrice Chia-Richmond serving as Creative Director. The ceremony was helmed by more than 5,000 performers and volunteers and supported by 3,500 soldiers. Given the enclosed nature of the stadium, extensive use of an aerial system to allow suspension and movement of performers and props are possible. Floor projection are accomplished using 160 multimedia high-definition projectors. The time 20:15 was chosen to start the opening ceremony to mark the year 2015, the year which Singapore hosted the 28th Southeast Asian Games.

Tony Tan Keng Yam, President of Singapore declared the games open, while former footballer, Fandi Ahmad and his son and current footballer, Irfan Fandi lit the cauldron.

Closing ceremony

The Games had its closing ceremony held on Tuesday, 16 June 2015, from 20:00 SST (UTC+8) at the National Stadium in Singapore. The ceremony begins with a countdown footage video followed by hosts of the ceremony enter the stadium in a buggy car who are also hosts of the games opening ceremony. Singapore president and the other VIPs including Lawrence Wong, Minister for Culture, Community and Youth and SEA Games Organising Committee chairman and Tan Chuan Jin, the Singapore Olympic Council and Southeast Asian Games Federation president then enter the stadium and after that a video about the games' wonderful moments is played. Athletes of every participating nations along with their respective head of mission paraded into the stadium onto the stadium floor to the beat of  music – Remix of the Songs of the Games played through the stadium, followed by the video tribute of the games volunteers, Team Nila.

Team Nila then entered the stadium and danced to the music played. Ng Ser Miang, IOC member and IOC Finance Commission Chairman awarded Lawrence Wong and Singaporean SEA Games President, Tan Chuan-Jin the IOC President trophy of the Olympics spirit on behalf of Thomas Bach, president of the International Olympic Committee. Tan Chuan-Jin then delivered a closing speech, in which he includes an emotional quote, paying tribute to all victims of the 2015 Sabah earthquake in which many Singaporean primary school students from Tanjong Katong Primary School died and all the national flags of the participating nations and the games flags been flown at half-mast on 8 June 2015 during the games. The Singapore president declared the games closed with Charlie Lim later performed the song, "Still" as the games flag and the SEA Games Federation flag were lowered and the flame of the cauldron extinguished. A group of torch bearer surrounded the cauldron lighter which sends off the firework after they had extinguished the flame of their torch. A bunch of fireworks then erupted over the National Stadium, signalling the official conclusion of the Games.

The SEA Games responsibilities was officially handed over to Malaysia, host of the 2017 Southeast Asian Games in which Khairy Jamaluddin, Minister of Youth and Sports of Malaysia receive the flag of the Southeast Asian Games Federation from Lawrence Wong and Tunku Imran, the Olympic Council of Malaysia president and in-coming Southeast Asian Games Federation president as its symbol during a flag handover ceremony. The national anthem of Malaysia was played as the National Flag of Malaysia was raised. A 10-minute Malaysian segment performance: "Diversity in Motion", was performed by Malaysian dancers with Monoloque and Najwa Mahiaddin sang "The Birth of a Legend" on the stage. The performance was divided into three parts: "Birth", "Rooted", and "United". Birth told the story of the beginning of life and creativity, Rooted told the story about building the foundation, desire for unity, understanding one's origin, living in the moment while remembering yesterday and to celebrate the aesthetics of athleticism today, while the conclusion United told the story of desire for unity in diversity.

A Singapore farewell segment performance is later performed with a parade of colonial era, people, symbols, uniform groups, landmarks, government policy and 1993 Southeast Asian Games stamps and objects such as Chinese Junk and Sail boat and the Singapore Airlines Airbus A380 aircraft, brought back the nation's historical memory in the past 60 years. For a brief moment, performers some dressed as Nila and others wearing the Nila suit dance to the music played. The ceremony concludes with a party with music spun by Dutch DJ Ferry Corsten, a performance by local fusion Jazz group The Steve McQueens and a bunch of fireworks erupted over the stadium again and for the last time.

Participating nations
An estimated total of 4490 athletes (about 2610 men, 1880 women) from 11 nations competed at the 2015 Southeast Asian Games.

 
 
 
 
 
 
 
 
  (host)

Sports
The first 30 sports were announced by the Singapore National Olympic Council on 10 December 2013 on the sidelines of the 27th SEA Games in Myanmar. It announced then that there was room for as many as eight more sports. On 29 April 2014, the final six sports, namely boxing, equestrian, floorball, petanque, rowing, and volleyball were added to the programme. Floorball will feature in the event for the first time after being a demonstration sport in the 2013 edition.

In its selection of events, the organising committee indicated their desire to set a model for subsequent games in trimming the number of "traditional" sports to refocus on the SEAG's initial intent to increase the level of sporting excellence in key sports. Hence, despite room for up to eight traditional sports, only two, floorball and netball, were included in the programme. Amongst the other 34 sports, 24 are Olympic sports and all remaining sports are featured in the Asian Games.

The 2015 Southeast Asian Games programme was featured 402 events in 36 sports and disciplines. The number of events in each discipline is noted in parentheses.

 Aquatics
 
 
 
 
 
 
 
 
  Billiards and snooker (10)¹
 
 
 
 
 
 
  Floorball (2)³
 
 
 
 
 
 
 ²
 ²
 
 
 
 ¹
 
 
 
 
 
 
  Traditional boat race (8)²
 
 
 
 ¹

¹ – not an official Olympic Sport.
² – sport played only in the SEAGF.
³ – not a traditional Olympic nor SEAGF Sport and introduced only by the host country.

Calendar

Medal table
The 2015 Southeast Asian Games featured 402 events, resulting in 402 medal sets to be distributed. 
 
An additional gold medal was awarded as there was first-place tie in the Rhythmic Gymnastics individual all-around event. As a consequence, no silver medal was awarded in that event.

Two bronze medals were awarded in some events: most events in martial arts (2 in Wushu, 12 in Taekwondo, 10 in Pencak silat, 12 in Judo, 11 in Boxing and 12 in Fencing) and All events in racket sports (10 in Billiards and snooker, 5 in Squash, 7 in Badminton, 7 in Table tennis, 7 in Tennis, 10 in Petanque, 10 in Sepak takraw, 1 in netball and 2 in volleyball), giving a total of 118 additional bronze medals. On the other hand, No bronze medal was awarded at the Rhythmic Gymnastics group all-around event, Women's Floorball, Taekwondo Poomsae Women's team, Kyorugi Men's 74 kg and Women's 62 kg event and Sailing Men's Match Racing Keelboat, Team Racing Laser Standard and Women's 470, Skiff 49er FX, Laser Radial (U19) and Team Racing Laser Radial event.

As a result, total of 1313 medals comprising 403 gold medals, 401 silver medals and 509 bronze medals were awarded to athletes.

Broadcasting
The games also available internationally via Sports Singapore's YouTube channel whose broadcast was done by International Games Broadcast Services (IGBS) as production partner of MediaCorp – the host broadcaster of the games. The International Broadcast Centre was located within the sports city area.

Key

 Host nation (Singapore)

Concerns and controversies
 In the Pencak silat men's class F (70–75 kg) event, Secretary–General of the Malaysian National Silat Federation Megat Zulkarnain Omardin was dissatisfied with what he claimed was an unfair ruling by the event's chairman of the jury in the semifinal match between Mohd Fauzi Khalid of Malaysia and Muhd Nur Alfian Juma'en of Singapore, the host nation. At the final moments of the last round, Muhd Nur Alfian made a controversial drop on Mohd Fauzi which was later deemed to be valid after consultation with the chairman as well as with the panel of five jury members. Megat Zulkarnain claimed that after watching video replays of the drop, he said that it shouldn't have been counted as Mohd Fauzi was "pulled down" instead of being dropped legally according to the regulations, and thus Malaysia should have won the match instead. He felt that the eventual decision to award the match to Singapore's Muhd Nur Alfian was just so as to "maintain the dignity of the home nation's pencak silat", whose statement was widely criticised by many nations as exhibiting unsportsmanlike conduct.
During the closing ceremony, spectators were shuffled from gate to gate in order to enter through a gate with fewer people resulting in them not being able to watch the ceremony. Some spectators were also told that the stadium was full. SINGSOC eventually made an official statement that they will offer a full refund to those who purchased a ticket and were unable to be seated, as well as receiving a supporters’ medallion.

See also
 2015 ASEAN Para Games

References

External links

 
 
SEA Games 28 
The Straits Times microsite
Official Results 
Official Results 2 
My Active SG Archived Results

 
Southeast Asian Games
Southeast Asian Games
Southeast Asian Games
Southeast Asian Games
International sports competitions hosted by Singapore
Multi-sport events in Singapore
Southeast Asian Games